Jean-Jacques Rakotomalala (born 3 January 1965) is a Malagasy judoka. He competed in the men's half-middleweight event at the 1992 Summer Olympics.

References

1965 births
Living people
Malagasy male judoka
Olympic judoka of Madagascar
Judoka at the 1992 Summer Olympics
Place of birth missing (living people)
African Games medalists in judo
Competitors at the 1991 All-Africa Games
African Games bronze medalists for Madagascar